
Year 897 (DCCCXCVII) was a common year starting on Saturday (link will display the full calendar) of the Julian calendar.

Events 
 By place 
 Europe 
 Spring – King Lambert II travels to Rome with his mother, Queen Ageltrude and brother Guy IV, Lombard duke of Spoleto, to meet Pope Stephen VI to receive reconfirmation of his imperial title. Guy is murdered on the Tiber by agents of Alberic I, a Frankish nobleman with political interests. He seizes Spoleto (possibly at the instigation of King Berengar I) and sets himself up as duke. 

 Britain 
 English warships (nine vessels from Alfred's new fleet) intercept six Viking longships in the mouth of an unknown estuary on the south coast (possibly at Poole Harbour) in Dorset. The Danes are blockaded, and three ships attempt to break through the English lines. Lashing the Viking boats to their own, the English crew board the enemy's vessels and kill everyone on board. Some ships manage to escape, two of the other three boats are driven against the Sussex coast. The shipwrecked sailors are brought before King Alfred the Great at Winchester and hanged. Just one Viking ship returns to East Anglia.

 Arabian Empire 
 Caliph al-Mu'tadid recovers control of the Cilician Thughur (southeastern Anatolia) and of northern Syria, during the turmoil in the Tulunid government (approximate date).
 15 March –  Al-Hadi ila'l-Haqq Yahya enters Sa'dah and founds the Zaydi Imamate of Yemen.

 Japan 
 Emperor Uda abdicates the throne after a ten year reign. He is succeeded by his 12-year-old son Daigo, as the 60th emperor of Japan.

 By topic 
 Religion 
 January – The Cadaver Synod: Lambert II orders Stephen VI to exhume the nine-month-old cadaver of former pope Formosus, to redress him in papal robes, and have him put on trial while seated in a chair at St. Peter's. Formosus is 'convicted' of several crimes, his fingers of consecration are cut off, and the body is stripped of his vestments.
 August – Stephen VI is removed from office, imprisoned and strangled in his cell. He is succeeded by Romanus as the 114th pope of the Catholic Church.
 December – Romanus is deposed and succeeded by Theodore II as the 115th pope of Rome, but dies twenty days later.

Births 
 Abu al-Faraj al-Isfahani, Arab historian (d. 967)
 Gyeongsun, king of Silla (Korea) (d. 978)
 Balderic, bishop of Utrecht (d. 975)
 Yang Longyan, king of Wu (d. 920)

Deaths 
 November 16 – Gu Yanhui, Chinese warlord
 Ali ibn Ahmad al-Madhara'i, Muslim vizier
 Buhturi, Muslim poet (b. 820)
 Ermengard of Italy, queen and regent of Provence
 Fujiwara no Sukeyo, Japanese aristocrat (b. 847)
 Guy IV, duke of Spoleto
 Heahstan, bishop of London
 Jinseong, queen of Silla (Korea)
 Li Zi ('Prince of Tong'), prince of the Tang Dynasty
 Mashdotz I, Armenian monk and catholicos (or 898)
 Minamoto no Yoshiari, Japanese official (b. 845)
 Stephen VI, pope of the Catholic Church
 Theodore II, pope of the Catholic Church (b. 840)
 Wilfred the Hairy, Frankish nobleman
 Ya'qubi, Muslim geographer (or 898)
 Zhaozhou, Chinese Zen Buddhist master (b. 778)
 Zhu Xuan, Chinese warlord and governor (jiedushi)

References